The 2013–14 SEC men's basketball season began with practices in October 2013, followed by the start of the 2013–14 NCAA Division I men's basketball season in November.  Conference play started in early January 2014 and concluded in March, followed by the 2014 SEC men's basketball tournament at the Georgia Dome in Atlanta.

Pre-season

() first place votes

Pre-season All-SEC teams

Coaches select 8 players
Players in bold are choices for SEC Player of the Year

Rankings

Regular season

Conference matrix
This table summarizes the head-to-head results between teams in conference play. (x) indicates games remaining this season.

Postseason

SEC tournament

  March 12–16, 2014 Southeastern Conference Basketball Tournament, Georgia Dome, Atlanta.

NCAA tournament

National Invitation tournament

College Basketball Invitational

NBA Draft

Honors and awards

All-Americans

All-SEC awards and teams

Coaches

Associated Press

References

External links
SEC website